Events in the year 2021 in Guam.

Incumbents

 Governor: Lou Leon Guerrero
 Lieutenant Governor: Josh Tenorio

Events
Ongoing – COVID-19 pandemic in Guam

May
 May 24 – In Guam v. United States, the U.S. Supreme Court rules that Guam can sue the federal government for damages resulting from a dumpsite operated by the United States Navy beginning in the 1940s.

Deaths
 

April 15 – Joe T. San Agustin, politician (born 1930).

See also
History of Guam

References

 
2020s in Guam
Years of the 21st century in Guam
Guam
Guam